Mogra railway station is a  Kolkata Suburban Railway station on the Howrah–Bardhaman main line operated by Eastern Railway zone of Indian Railway. It is situated beside Polba Road, Alikhoja, Mogra in Hooghly district in the Indian state of West Bengal. All EMU and passenger trains stops at Mogra railway station. The construction work of third line between Bandel and Bardhaman is completed for which a new platform(1) is created. Mogra-Katwa line connecting Magra on Howrah–Bardhaman Main line with Tribeni on Bandel–Katwa line is also there. As of now it is only use for goods train transport. Another line from Tarwakeshwar to Magra via Dhaniakhali is also in development. Magra will be transferred to Magra Junction soon after the development of the Magra-Tarakeshwar line via Dhaniakhali. Lands for the new Magra-Tarakeshwar line are brought by the government and it is also in development.

History
Bandel to Bardhaman route was opened for traffic on 1 January 1885. Electrification of the Howrah–Bardhaman main line was initiated up to Bandel in 1957, with the 3000V DC system, and the entire Howrah–Bardhaman route including Mogra railway station completed with AC system, along with conversion of earlier DC portions to 25 kV AC, in 1958.

References

Railway stations in Hooghly district
Kolkata Suburban Railway stations
Howrah railway division